Hurricane Flora is among the deadliest Atlantic hurricanes in recorded history, with a death total of at least 7,193. After remaining a weak depression for several days, it rapidly organized on September 29 to attain tropical storm status.

The storm struck southwestern Haiti near peak intensity, turned to the west, and drifted over Cuba for four days before turning to the northeast. Flora passed over the Bahamas and accelerated northeastward, becoming an extratropical cyclone on October 12. Due to its slow movement across Cuba, Flora is the wettest known tropical cyclone for Cuba, Haiti, and the Dominican Republic. The significant casualties caused by Flora were the most for a tropical cyclone in the Atlantic Basin since the 1900 Galveston Hurricane.

Meteorological history

Upon forming, the depression had a poorly organized circulation with banding features to its north and east. The depression moved west-northwestward, and the system failed to organize significantly by a day after developing. On September 27, the banding features dissipated, though the area of convection around the center increased. Satellite imagery was unavailable until September 30, during which there were not sufficient ship reports to indicate the presence of a low-level circulation. Operationally, advisories were not initiated until a day later.

Flora quickly intensified after it became a tropical storm, and early on September 30 it attained hurricane status. One observer noted Flora to be the best organized tropical cyclone over the previous two years. The hurricane continued west-northwestward as it entered the Caribbean, and early on October 2 its winds reached .

The calm of the eye lasted for up to 70 minutes in one location. A high pressure system to its north turned the motion of the hurricane to a westward drift, causing it to weaken quickly over land. Flora neared the north coast of Cuba on October 4 before turning to the south. It executed a cyclonic loop and entered the coastal waters off Granma Province. Flora initially turned southeastward over central Cuba, and late on October 8 a short-wave trough turned the hurricane northeastward, bringing it into the coastal waters of the Holguín Province. Flora remained a hurricane while drifting over land due to abundant moisture and a favorable upper level environment.

The hurricane gradually weakened as it continued northeastward, and weakened to a Category 1 hurricane on October 11. The extratropical remnant dissipated the next day.

Preparations
The Weather Bureau in San Juan, Puerto Rico, issued a hurricane warning for Trinidad, Tobago, and the Grenadines south of Saint Vincent in the cyclone's first advisory on Hurricane Flora. Gale warnings were later issued for islands off northern Venezuela and from Saint Vincent northward to Martinique. Advisories on Flora emphasized the danger of the hurricane and advised preparations to be rushed to completion. The advisories also recommended small craft throughout the Windward Islands to remain at harbor and for shipping in the path of the hurricane to advise extreme caution. People in low-lying areas and near beaches were advised to evacuate to higher grounds, as well. Lead time was short, especially in Tobago which received news of the approaching hurricane just two hours before it struck.

On October 2, two days before it made landfall on southwestern Hispaniola, the San Juan Weather Bureau issued a gale warning from Barahona in the Dominican Republic to Sud-Est, Haiti. Advisories recommended small craft in the southern portions of the countries to remain at port. Later that day, the gale warning was upgraded to a hurricane warning in southwestern Haiti. On the day of when Flora made landfall, advisories recommended all citizens on beaches and in low-lying areas west of Santo Domingo to evacuate. Carmelo Di Franco, the provisional Director of Civic Defense for the Dominican Republic, organized safety procedures and the dissemination of tropical cyclone bulletins from the San Juan Weather Bureau. Di Franco also organized for the transmission of hurricane emergency information to citizens, believed to reduce the loss of life. On the afternoon before the hurricane struck, the head of the Haitian Red Cross prohibited radio broadcasts of tropical cyclone advisories for fear of panic among citizens. As a result, many thought the hurricane would miss the country.

Officials at the Cuban National Observatory issued radio bulletins on the hurricane, which included the position of Flora, its intensity, direction of motion, and necessary warnings. By the time the hurricane left the island, more than 40,000 had been evacuated to safer areas.

The Weather Bureau predicted Flora to turn to the northwest after entering the Windward Passage and affect the Bahamas. Forecasters advised those in The Bahamas to quickly complete preparations, though the eye of the hurricane did not pass over the archipelago until four days later. When Flora turned to the northeast out to sea, forecasters again advised Bahamian citizens to prepare for the hurricane, and on October 9, weather advisories advised the southeastern Bahamas to prepare for gale-force winds and strong tides. One advisory considered there to be less than a 50% chance of the hurricane reaching southeastern Florida, though weather bulletins advised Florida citizens to monitor the hurricane. At its closest approach to Florida, the hurricane remained 330 miles (530 km) away, though gale warnings were issued from Stuart to Key West due to the hurricane's large size.

Impact

Throughout its path, Hurricane Flora resulted in more than 7,000 deaths and over $525 million in damage (1963 USD, $  USD). It is estimated that, if a hurricane like Flora had struck in 1998, it would have caused over 12,000 casualties.

East Caribbean
Hurricane Flora passed Barbados a few days after Hurricane Edith moved through the area. The two hurricanes resulted in about $65,000 in damage (1963 USD), primarily to fishing interests.

About four hours before the eye of Hurricane Flora moved over Tobago, the large hurricane began producing heavy rainfall throughout the island. The hurricane sunk six ships between 4 and 9 tons in Scarborough harbour. One crew member drowned while attempting to save his vessel. Heavy rainfall caused a large mudslide from Mount Dillon onto a road leading to Castara. This was considered the most well-known mudslide on the island. The strong winds caused severe damage to coconut, banana, and cocoa plantations, with 50% of the coconut trees being destroyed and another 11% being severely damaged. 75% of forest trees fell, and most of the remaining were greatly damaged. The passage of Hurricane Flora destroyed 2,750 of Tobago's 7,500 houses, and damaged 3,500 others. The hurricane killed 18 on the island and resulted in $30 million in crop and property damage (1963 USD).

Heavy rainfall and strong winds in the northern mountainous region lowered the visibility to zero. Due to the mountain range on its northern coast, damage on the island was minimal, totaling to $100,000 (1963 USD). Two people on the island died due to drowning. When Flora passed the island and the winds turned to the southwest, many small boats in the westward facing harbor were sunk. Near Chaguaramas, nine boats were destroyed and eight were damaged. Additionally, several large vessels sustained damage and resulted in them being intentionally sunk. Damage in Grenada was minor, around $25,000 (1963 USD), though six people died due to drowning. Rough seas and higher than normal tides were reported along the south coast of Puerto Rico, though no damage or deaths were reported there.

Dominican Republic and Haiti

Flora produced heavy rainfall and moderately strong winds in the Dominican Republic. Flooding from the hurricane, considered to be the most extensive on record, greatly damaged bridges and roads, with many roads left unpassable for several months after the hurricane struck. Over 3,800 sq. miles (10,000 km²) in the western portion of the country were flooded. The hurricane caused about $60 million in damage (1963 USD) and over 400 deaths.

One location in the southwestern peninsula recorded  of precipitation in 12 hours. The storm surge on the southern coast is unknown, but estimated to exceed . Flash floods from the hurricane washed out large sections of several towns, while mudslides buried some entire towns, resulting in many deaths. The flood waters created new channels and washed away entire banana plantations.

Strong winds in southwestern Haiti from the hurricane damaged or destroyed hundreds of trees. The path of Flora over the area was best determined by the trajectory of fallen trees across the peninsula. The strong winds left entire villages roofless, with many buildings entirely destroyed. The combination of rough waves and strong winds destroyed three entire communities. Many of those who died in southwestern Haiti suffered from intense burns from strong winds. In most areas, crops were entirely destroyed. The coffee crop was harvested prior to the arrival of the hurricane, though heavy rainfall and severe flooding ruined the crop for later years. Additionally, strong winds downed shading trees for the coffee crop on the southern peninsula. One official estimated it would require three years for the coffee crop to be replanted and regrown.

About 3,500 people were confirmed dead, with several thousands missing at one report five months after the hurricane. It is estimated the passage of Hurricane Flora killed around 5,000 people and caused between $125 million and $180 million in damage in Haiti (1963 USD).

Cuba, Jamaica, the Bahamas, and Florida

Santa Cruz del Sur reported strong southerly winds and rough seas. Winds in Cuba reached . Due to its slow movement across Cuba, the storm dropped extreme rainfall amounts on the eastern side of the island. Strong winds and flooding caused significant damage to crops in the region. The storm destroyed about 25% of coffee, 10% of the corn, up to 15% of sugar crops throughout the country, while at least a majority of banana and orange crops were lost. Further, Flora destroyed an estimated 50% of winter rice crops in Camagüey and Oriente provinces – roughly 25% of production nationally. Approximately 50% of cotton was lost in Oriente Province, which produced about half of Cuba's cotton crop.

Many citizens were left stranded at the tops of their homes. Floodwaters damaged or destroyed tens of thousands of homes throughout Cuba. A tabulation complete through October 20 indicated that the storm damaged approximately 21,000 homes and destroyed more than 11,000 others in Oriente Province alone. Throughout the country, the hurricane destroyed as many as 30,000 dwellings. Many bridges, highways, and railroads, particularly in Oriente Province, became impassable due to flooding, landslides, and washouts. However, much of the damage was incurred to secondary highways and railways. Overall, Flora caused about $500 million in damage in Cuba and approximately 1,750 fatalities.

Heavy rainfall fell across the island of Jamaica due to southwest flow into the mountains on Flora's southern periphery over several days. Damage to the island totaled $11.9 million (1963 dollars). Rough seas from Flora affected the Bahamas and the southeastern Florida coast on October 5 as the hurricane stalled over Cuba, keeping small craft in port, and hurricane-force winds affected Ragged Island later that day. Damage to the island archipelago reached $1.5 million (1963 dollars).

Aftermath

In Tobago, the great agricultural damage from Flora caused the crop plantations to be abandoned. As a result, the economy of the island changed towards tourism. The destruction of the Tobagonian rainforests resulted in a continual decline of agriculture on the island due to animals previously in the forest eating the crops for food. The passage of the hurricane reduced the height of the rainforest canopy above  by half. Twenty-five years passed before the canopy reached its previous height.

In the Dominican Republic, damage reports were largely unknown by a month after the hurricane passed the island, primarily in the western provinces. One official estimated several months would pass before survey teams could obtain information on loss of life and overall damages.

The government of Cuba implemented further restrictions on ongoing rations, including adding rations on sugar for the first time in the country's history. Amidst a political crisis between Cuba and the United States, the Cuban Red Cross refused aid from the American Red Cross, referring to the offer of aid as hypocritical "by a country [the United States] that is trying to destroy us [Cuba] with economic blockades and other measures." The Soviet Union delivered large quantities of food, medicine, and other supplies vital to recovery, while the other satellite states in Europe promised aid. China sent medicine and powdered milk totaling about $200,000 in value while also contributing the same amount in cash.

Due to its impact on the Caribbean nations, the name Flora was retired after this year and was replaced by Fern.

See also

 List of Atlantic hurricanes
 List of wettest tropical cyclones
 List of wettest tropical cyclones in Cuba since 1963
 List of Cuba hurricanes
 List of South America tropical cyclones

References

Flora
Flora
Flora
Flora
Flora
Flora
Flora
Flora
Flora
Flora
Flora
1963 in the Dominican Republic
History of British Grenada
1963 in Cuba